G protein-coupled estrogen receptor 1 (GPER), also known as G protein-coupled receptor 30 (GPR30), is a protein that in humans is encoded by the GPER gene. GPER binds to and is activated by the female sex hormone estradiol and is responsible for some of the rapid effects that estradiol has on cells.

Discovery 
The classical estrogen receptors first characterized in 1958 are water-soluble proteins located in the interior of cells that are activated by estrogenenic hormones such as estradiol and several of its metabolites such as estrone or estriol. These proteins belong to the nuclear hormone receptor class of transcription factors that regulate gene transcription. Since it takes time for genes to be transcribed into RNA and translated into protein, the effects of estrogens binding to these classical estrogen receptors is delayed.  However, estrogens are also known to have effects that are too fast to be caused by regulation of gene transcription.  In 2005, it was discovered that a member of the G protein-coupled receptor (GPCR) family, GPR30 also binds with high affinity to estradiol and is responsible in part for the rapid non-genomic actions of estradiol.  Based on its ability to bind estradiol, GPR30 was renamed as G protein-coupled estrogen receptor (GPER). GPER is localized in the plasma membrane but is predominantly detected in the endoplasmic reticulum.

Ligands 
GPER binds estradiol with high affinity though not other endogenous estrogens, such as estrone or estriol, nor other endogenous steroids, including progesterone, testosterone, and cortisol. Although potentially involved in signaling by aldosterone, GPER does not show any detectable binding towards aldosterone. Niacin and nicotinamide bind to the receptor in vitro with very low affinity. CCL18 has been identified as an endogenous antagonist of the GPER. GPER-selective ligands (that do not bind the classical estrogen receptors) include the agonist G-1 and the antagonists G15 and G36.

Agonists
 2-Methoxyestradiol
 2,2',5'-PCB-4-OH
 Afimoxifene
 Aldosterone
 Atrazine
 Bisphenol A
 Daidzein
 DDT (p,p'-DDT, o',p'-DDE)
 Diarylpropionitrile (DPN)
 Equol
 Estradiol
 Ethynylestradiol
 Fulvestrant (ICI-182780))
 G-1
 Genistein
 GPER-L1
 GPER-L2
 Hydroxytyrosol
 Kepone
 Niacin
 Nicotinamide
 Nonylphenol
 Oleuropein
 Protocatechuic aldehyde
 Propylpyrazoletriol (PPT)
 Quercetin
 Raloxifene
 Resveratrol
 STX
 Tamoxifen
 Tectoridin

Antagonists
 CCL18
 Estriol
 G15
 G36
 MIBE

Unknown
 Diethylstilbestrol
 Zearalenone

Non-ligand
 17α-Estradiol
 Estrone

Function 
This protein is a member of the rhodopsin-like family of G protein-coupled receptors and is a multi-pass membrane protein that localizes to the plasma membrane. The protein binds estradiol, resulting in intracellular calcium mobilization and synthesis of phosphatidylinositol (3,4,5)-trisphosphate in the nucleus. This protein therefore plays a role in the rapid nongenomic signaling events widely observed following stimulation of cells and tissues with estradiol. The distribution of GPER is well established in the rodent, with high expression observed in the hypothalamus, pituitary gland, adrenal medulla, kidney medulla and developing follicles of the ovary.

Animal studies

Reproductive tissue 
Estradiol produces cell proliferation in both normal and malignant breast epithelial tissue. However, GPER knockout mice show no overt mammary phenotype, unlike ERα knockout mice, but similarly to ERβ knockout mice. This indicates that although GPER and ERβ play a modulatory role in breast development, ERα is the main receptor responsible for estrogen-mediated breast tissue growth. GPER is expressed in germ cells and has been found to be essential for male fertility, specifically, in spermatogenesis. GPER has been found to modulate gonadotropin-releasing hormone (GnRH) secretion in the hypothalamic-pituitary-gonadal (HPG) axis.

Cardiovascular effects 
GPER is expressed in the blood vessel endothelium and is responsible for vasodilation and as a result, blood pressure lowering effects of 17β-estradiol.  GPER also regulates components of the renin–angiotensin system, which also controls blood pressure, and is required for superoxide-mediated cardiovascular function and aging.

Central nervous system activity 
GPER and ERα, but not ERβ, have been found to mediate the antidepressant-like effects of estradiol. Contrarily, activation of GPER has been found to be anxiogenic in mice, while activation of ERβ has been found to be anxiolytic. There is a high expression of GPER, as well as ERβ, in oxytocin neurons in various parts of the hypothalamus, including the paraventricular nucleus and the supraoptic nucleus. It is speculated that activation of GPER may be the mechanism by which estradiol mediates rapid effects on the oxytocin system, for instance, rapidly increasing oxytocin receptor expression. Estradiol has also been found to increase oxytocin levels and release in the medial preoptic area and medial basal hypothalamus, actions that may be mediated by activation of GPER and/or ERβ. Estradiol, as well as tamoxifen and fulvestrant, have been found to rapidly induce lordosis through activation of GPER in the arcuate nucleus of the hypothalamus of female rats.

Metabolic roles 
Female GPER knockout mice display hyperglycemia and impaired glucose tolerance, reduced body growth, and increased blood pressure. Male GPER knockout mice are observed to have increased growth, body fat, insulin resistance and glucose intolerance, dyslipidemia, increased osteoblast function (mineralization), resulting in higher bone mineral density and trabecular bone volume, and persistent growth plate activity resulting in longer bones. The GPER-selective agonist G-1 shows therapeutic efficacy in mouse models of obesity and diabetes.

Role in cancer 
Although GPER signaling was originally thought to be tumor-promoting in breast cancer, subsequent reports suggest that nonclassical estrogen signaling is tumor suppressive in breast cancer. Consistent with this, recent studies showed that the presence of GPER protein in human breast cancer biopsies correlates with longer survival, suggesting a tumor suppressive role.  In line with findings in breast cancer, GPER signaling has also been shown to be tumor suppressive in adrenocortical carcinoma, colorectal cancer, endometrial cancer, Leydig cell tumors, non-small cell lung cancer, gastric cancer, liver cancer, melanoma, osteosarcoma, ovarian cancer, and prostate cancer. Together, these reports suggest that GPER is a tumor suppressor in a wide range of cancer types, and activation of GPER may represent a new therapeutic strategy to treat cancer.

Role in neurological disorders 
GPER is broadly expressed on the nervous system, and GPER activation promotes beneficial effects in several brain disorders. A study suggests that GPER levels were significantly lower in children with ADHD compared to controls.

See also
 Membrane estrogen receptor
 Gq-mER
 ER-X
 ERx

References

External links
 
 

G protein-coupled receptors